Elections were held in the U.S. state of Alabama on November 2, 2004.

Overall results

2004 Presidential Election

Overall

By County

Autauga

Baldwin

Barbour

Bibb

United States Senate

External links
Elections Division (Alabama Office of the Secretary of State)
CNN coverage of 2004 USA Elections

 
Alabama
Alabama elections by year